Daram Rud may refer to:
 Daram Rud, Kerman (درم رود - Daram Rūd)
 Daram Rud, Kurdistan (دارامرود - Dārām Rūd)

See also
 Daramrud (disambiguation)